Maurice E. "Mike" DeLory (October 5, 1927 – March 31, 2016) was a Canadian politician. He represented the electoral district of Lunenburg West in the Nova Scotia House of Assembly from 1970 to 1978. He is a member of the Nova Scotia Liberal Party.

DeLory was born in Georgetown, Prince Edward Island. He attended Prince of Wales College and Dalhousie University, earning B.Sc., M.D. and C.M. degrees. He was a surgeon. In 1955, he married Burdette MacInnis. He served in the Executive Council of Nova Scotia as Provincial Secretary, Minister of Lands and Forests, and Minister of Tourism.

References

1927 births
2016 deaths
Nova Scotia Liberal Party MLAs
Members of the Executive Council of Nova Scotia
Dalhousie University alumni
People from Kings County, Prince Edward Island
People from Lunenburg County, Nova Scotia